De Beer is a Dutch and Afrikaans surname, meaning "the bear". Notable people with the surname include:

 (c.1590–1651), Dutch painter and engraver active in Spain; son of Joos
Dylan de Beer (born 1982), Zimbabwean cricketer
Esmond Samuel de Beer (1895–1990), New Zealand bibliophile, art collector and philanthropist
Fritz de Beer (born 1996), South African cricketer
Gavin de Beer (1899–1972), British evolutionary embryologist 
Gerhard de Beer (born 1994), South African football player
 (born 1957), Dutch illustrator and author
Jan de Beer (c.1475–1528), Flemish painter and draughtsman
Jannie de Beer (born 1971), South African rugby player
Johan de Beer (born 1972), South African tennis player
Joos de Beer (<1535–1591), Dutch painter
Lonell de Beer (born 1980), South African cricketer
Lotte de Beer, Dutch opera director
María Eugenia de Beer (died 1652), Spanish engraver; daughter of Cornelius
Racheltjie de Beer (1831–1843), Afrikaner heroine who may be fictional
Roman de Beer (born 1994), South African racing driver
Sue de Beer (born 1973), American artist
Surina De Beer (born 1978), South African tennis player
Tinus de Beer (born 1996), South African rugby player
Walter Wolff de Beer (1892–1983), Dutch philatelist 
Willem de Beer (born 1988), South African sprinter
Willy de Beer (born 1942), Dutch speed skater
Wolfgang de Beer (born 1964), German footballer
Zach de Beer (1928–1999), South African politician and businessman

See also
De Beers, diamond company named after the farmers Diederik Arnoldus and Johannes Nicolaas de Beer who sold the land with one of the first diamond mines of the company
DeBeer Lacrosse, American sports equipment manufacturer

Dutch-language surnames
Afrikaans-language surnames